Yang Cheng-wu (born 26 June 1972) is a Taiwanese politician. He served as Magistrate of Kinmen County since 25 December 2018 until 25 December 2022, having won the office in the 2018 Taiwanese local elections. Prior to contesting the magistracy, Yang represented Kinmen County in the Legislative Yuan.

Education
Yang obtained his bachelor's degree in economics from Chinese Culture University and master's degree in business administration from University of Westminster in the United Kingdom.

Political career

Legislative Yuan

Yang became the Ninth Legislative Yuan member after winning the 2016 general election representing Kinmen County Constituency.

In August 2017, Yang called on for closer cooperation between the Ministry of Health and Welfare and Ministry of Transportation and Communications in creating the helipad and providing the agreed medical evacuation helicopter for Kinmen residents.

In October 2017, Yang participated in the local Kinmen referendum in questioning the establishment of casino in the county. He openly opposed such establishment and supported the negative outcome of the referendum.

On 5 August 2018, Yang attended the ceremony marking the first day of Kinmen importing water from Mainland China.

2018 Kinmen County magistrate election

On 24 November 2018, Yang won the Kinmen County magistrate election defeating the incumbent independent Chen Fu-hai.

Magistracy
In order to develop Kinmen, Yang held his first official visit to Mainland China just about two month after his inauguration as the county magistrate. While visiting Quanzhou and Xiamen in Fujian, he led a delegation from various department of the county government to promote the tourism and products of Kinmen to the mainland people.

On 12 August 2019, Yang, along with Penghu County Magistrate Lai Feng-wei and Lienchiang County Magistrate Liu Cheng-ying, visited Beijing and met with Taiwan Affairs Office Director Liu Jieyi requesting Mainland China government to lift up individual travel ban of Mainland Chinese tourists to the three counties due to the constraint cross-strait relations. The mainland government eventually agreed to lift up the ban on 20 September 2019.

In late April 2020, Magistrate Yang visited Wuqiu for the first time as magistrate and stayed overnight.

References

External links

 

1972 births
Living people
Taiwanese people of Hoklo descent
Chinese Culture University alumni
Magistrates of Kinmen County